"Sound of Love" is a ballad number performed by the Bee Gees, It was written by Barry, Robin & Maurice Gibb, and appeared on their album Odessa in 1969.

Background
It was originally recorded at Atlantic Studios, New York City on August 20, 1968, and was finished at IBC Studios, London in November of that year. A mix with the original vocal take appears on the Sketches for Odessa disc released with the remastered edition in 2009. The song starts with a piano introduction from Maurice Gibb, the bass and drums  come in at 0:37. The orchestra was conducted by Bill Shepherd, with a powerful lead vocal from Barry Gibb.

Personnel
 Barry Gibb — lead vocal, guitar
 Maurice Gibb — piano, bass, guitar
 Vince Melouney — guitar
 Colin Petersen — drums
 Bill Shepherd — orchestral arrangement

Cover versions
 Etta James recorded this song and released on her 1970 album Etta James Sings Funk. The version was arranged by Gene Barge and produced by Barge and Ralph Bass, and James' version was released as the B-side of "When I Stop Dreaming" on Cadet Records.
 The Sandpipers recorded this song on their Come Saturday Morning album also in 1970 on A&M Records.

References

1969 songs
Bee Gees songs
Songs written by Barry Gibb
Songs written by Robin Gibb
Songs written by Maurice Gibb
Song recordings produced by Robert Stigwood
Song recordings produced by Barry Gibb
Song recordings produced by Robin Gibb
Song recordings produced by Maurice Gibb
1960s ballads